Dorymyrmex amazonicus is a Neotropical species of ant in the subfamily Dolichoderinae.

The species is known only from its type locality in Colombia. The type series was collected in the vicinity of an Amazonian forest relict, outside Leticia, Colombia. All the specimens were collected in open deforested habitat, probably this is an indication of the preference of this species to nest in highly anthropic or disturbed environments.

Queens and males are unknown.

References

Dorymyrmex
Insects described in 2011
Hymenoptera of South America